Gazza minuta, the toothpony or toothed ponyfish, is a species of marine ray-finned fish, a ponyfish from the family Leiognathidae. It is found in the Indo-Pacific from the Red Sea and the east African coast east through the Indian and Pacific Oceans to Australia and Tahiti north as far as the Ryukyu Islands. It occurs over sandy and silty bottoms, although the young prefer mangroves and silty reefs. it feeds using its protruding pipette-like mouth or using the gill rakers as seives. Its food consists of smaller fishes, crustaceans and polychaetes.

References

External links
 Toothed Ponyfish @ Fishes of Australia

Leiognathidae
Marine fauna of East Africa
Marine fish of Southeast Asia
Marine fish of Northern Australia
Fish of the Indian Ocean
Taxa named by Marcus Elieser Bloch
Fish described in 1795
Bioluminescent fish